The 1925 Tour de France was the 19th edition of Tour de France, one of cycling's Grand Tours. The Tour began in Paris with a flat stage on 21 June, and Stage 10 occurred on 4 July with a flat stage from Perpignan. The race finished in Paris on 19 July.

Stage 10
4 July 1925 — Perpignan to Nîmes,

Stage 11
5 July 1925 — Nîmes to Toulon,

Stage 12
7 July 1925 — Toulon to Nice,

Stage 13
9 July 1925 — Nice to Briançon,

Stage 14
11 July 1925 — Briançon to Évian,

Stage 15
13 July 1925 — Évian to Mulhouse,

Stage 16
15 July 1925 — Mulhouse to Metz,

Stage 17
17 July 1925 — Metz to Dunkerque,

Stage 18
19 July 1925 — Dunkerque to Paris,

References

1925 Tour de France
Tour de France stages